was a professional Japanese baseball player, coach, and manager. He was elected to the Japanese Baseball Hall of Fame in 2003.

External links

1937 births
2017 deaths
Baseball people from Tokushima Prefecture
Japanese baseball players
Nippon Professional Baseball catchers
Hiroshima Carp players
Managers of baseball teams in Japan
Orix Buffaloes managers
Hokkaido Nippon-Ham Fighters managers
Japanese Baseball Hall of Fame inductees